An origamist or an origamian is a person who is associated with the art of origami. Some notable origamists / origamians are:

A 
Jay Ansill – composer and folk musician who also wrote The Origami Sourcebook

D 
Martin Demaine and Erik Demaine – father-and-son team who manipulate flat paper into swirling forms.

E 
Peter Engel – author of several origami books including Origami from Angelfish to Zen, 10-Fold Origami: Fabulous Paperfolds You Can Make in Just 10 Steps!, and Origami Odyssey

F 
Tomoko Fuse (布施 知子) – famous for boxes and unit origami

G 
Ilan Garibi – Israeli origami artist and designer
Alice Gray – co-founder of the non-profit Friends of the Origami Center in New York

H 
Robert Harbin – popularised origami in Britain; also presented a series of short programmes entitled Origami, made by Thames Television for ITV
Jacob Hashimoto – created a large-scale paper mobile at Mary Boone Gallery
David A. Huffman – American electrical engineer
Tom Hull – American mathematics professor
Humiaki Huzita – formulated the first six of the Huzita–Hatori axioms

J 
Eric Joisel – French wet-folder renowned for his lifelike masks, including those of fellow origami enthusiasts

K 
Satoshi Kamiya – one of the youngest geniuses of the origami field (born 1981)
Kunihiko Kasahara – devised a standardized method for creating many modular polyhedra
Toshikazu Kawasaki – Japanese mathematician famous for his Iso-area folding theory and his many geometric folds, including Kawasaki's "Rose"
Marc Kirschenbaum – known for his instrumentalist designs

L 
Robert J. Lang – author of many Origami books including the new benchmark Origami Design Secrets; formerly a laser physicist at NASA before quitting in 2001 and committing to origami full-time
David Lister – founding member of the British Origami Society

M 
Sipho Mabona – Swiss and South African origami master who created a life-size elephant from a single piece of paper.
Jun Maekawa – software engineer, mathematician, and origami artist known for popularizing the method of utilizing crease patterns in designing origami models
Matthew T. Mason – American roboticist who developed the first origami folding robot, demonstrating advances in difficult manipulation tasks
Ligia Montoya – Argentine paper-folder who played a crucial role in establishing paper-folding as an international movement
John Montroll – probably the most prolific Western artist and author of over 40 books on origami
Jeannine Mosley – best known for her origami models created from business cards, including the Menger Sponge. She has developed mathematical techniques for designing and analyzing curved origami models.

O 
Lillian Rose Vorhaus Kruskal Oppenheimer – American origami pioneer whose birthday (October 24) is one of the World Origami Days.

R 
Samuel Randlett – helped design and popularize the Yoshizawa-Randlett diagramming system
Nick Robinson – professional origami artist and author of over one hundred books on origami

S 
Jeremy Shafer – professional entertainer and origamist based in Berkeley, California

T 
Florence Temko – pioneer in spreading origami in the United States
Norio Torimoto – Japanese origami artist based in Sweden since the 1970s

U 
Kōshō Uchiyama – Sōtō priest, origami master, and abbot of Antai-ji near Kyoto, Japan, and author of more than twenty books on Zen Buddhism and origami
Miguel de Unamuno – Spanish essayist, novelist, poet, playwright and philosopher who devised many new models and popularized origami in Spain and South America.

Y 
Makoto Yamaguchi – Chairperson of Origami House
Akira Yoshizawa – reinvented modern origami and created the modern repertoire of folding symbols

References

 
Origami
Origamists